Saint Saviour may refer to:

 Jesus as Saviour (Sanctus Salvator), a Latin dedication of churches, more often translated into English as "Holy Saviour"

Places
Saint Saviour, Guernsey, a parish in Guernsey
Saint Saviour, Jersey, a parish in Jersey
St Saviour's Dock, a dock in London, England
Monastery of Saint Saviour, a monastery in Jerusalem

Schools
St Saviour's and St Olave's Church of England School, Southwark, London, England
St Saviour's Grammar School, one of its predecessors
Saint Saviour High School of Brooklyn, New York

People
Saint Saviour (musician), British singer

See also
St Saviour's Church (disambiguation)
St Saviour Cathedral (disambiguation)
San Salvador (disambiguation), the Spanish equivalent
Saint-Sauveur (disambiguation), the French equivalent
St Salvator's College, St Andrews, Scotland